Adele Lim is a Malaysian film and television producer and screenwriter. She is best known for writing films Crazy Rich Asians and Raya and the Last Dragon. She has given support to young writers as mentor and speaker for the Coalition of Asian Pacifics in Entertainment (CAPE).

Early life 
Lim was born in Malaysia and is of Malaysian Chinese descent. She attended Malaysia's Sri Aman Girls School in Petaling Jaya. She started writing as a teenager and undergraduate in the lifestyle section of a local daily. She graduated from Emerson College in Boston, Massachusetts with a degree in TV/Film in 1996.

Career 
Lim started her career as a script coordinator for Xena: Warrior Princess, getting the job despite her resume being, as she described, "nonexistent". She has written for TV series such as One Tree Hill, Life Unexpected, Reign, Star-Crossed, Private Practice and Lethal Weapon.

In 2018, Lim was the co-screenwriter for the 2018 movie Crazy Rich Asians. She has reportedly left writing on the sequel, following reports that she was offered significantly less pay than her white, male co-writer Peter Chiarelli. Warner Brothers defended the offer, citing the difference in experience between the two.

Lim was recruited by Disney to develop an animated feature film Raya and the Last Dragon. She served as screenwriter alongside Qui Nguyen.

Filmography

Film

Television

References

External links

Adele Lim in Writers Guild of America West

Living people
Year of birth missing (living people)
American people of Chinese descent
American people of Malaysian descent
Malaysian emigrants to the United States
American screenwriters
Screenwriting instructors
American women television writers
American television writers
21st-century American women